Brendán Îngle  (19 June 1940 – 25 May 2018) was an Irish boxing trainer, manager and former professional boxer based in Sheffield, England. Ingle trained four world champions in total at his Wincobank gym, including Johnny Nelson, "Prince" Naseem Hamed, Junior Witter, and Kell Brook.

Professional career
He had a professional record of 19 wins and 14 losses.

Boxing trainer
While living in Wincobank, Sheffield, England, Ingle was asked by a local vicar to carry out some community work because youth in the area were "running wild." He knew nothing but boxing, but he organised a weekly dance at St Thomas' church hall and the boxing gym St Thomas' Boys & Girls Club was opened.

Herol "Bomber" Graham, undefeated in ten years is what Ingle would call "the best person to come out of our gym," although perhaps Ingle is best known for being Naseem Hamed's mentor from the age of seven to 25. He has also trained former IBF Light Heavyweight titlist Clinton Woods and was the  trainer of former WBC Light Welterweight titlist Junior Witter. He also was trainer of former WBO cruiserweight champion Johnny Nelson. He lived in Wincobank, Sheffield, just across the road from his gym, St Thomas' Boys and Girls Club.

In total he has trained four world champions, six European, 15 British and six Commonwealth champions. Ingle's fighters relied on footwork and reflexes for defence, leaving the hands free for offensive activity.

Brendan's sons, Dominic and John, both run the Ingle Gym their father established.

Honours and personal life
He has also lectured at Sheffield Hallam University where he was awarded an honorary doctorate. Ingle was awarded an MBE in 1998 for his services and contributions to British boxing and his work with young people in the Sheffield area. In August 2014, Ingle was one of 200 public figures who were signatories to a letter to The Guardian opposing Scottish independence in the run-up to September's referendum on that issue.

Ingle died in May 2018 due to a brain hemorrhage at the age of 77.  Upon his death, former student Johnny Nelson paid tribute to Ingle as "the best trainer in the world".

References

External links
Boxers Ingle is managing
 
Guardian interview - Ingle gets his gloves on to floor racial divide

1940 births
2018 deaths
Boxing trainers
Sport in Sheffield
Irish male boxers
Honorary Members of the Order of the British Empire
Middleweight boxers
Sportspeople from Dublin (city)